Ambuttu Imbuttu Embuttu is a 2005 Indian Tamil-language comedy film directed by Ashok Kashyap. The film stars Ashok Kashyap, Ashwini, Mohana, Tejaswini Prakash and Crane Manohar with Vinaya Prasad, Sudheesh, Madhan Bob, Sathyapriya and Adade Manohar playing supporting roles. It was released on 1 November 2005. The film was a remake of Kannada film Ulta Palta (1997), which itself was based on William Shakespeare's play The Comedy of Errors.

Plot
In Palakkad, Thirupathi (Ashok Kashyap) completed his studies and graduated in MBA. Thirupathi lives a wealthy lifestyle with his loyal servant Pazhani (Crane Manohar), his aunt Vijaya (Vinaya Prasad) and his two cousins: Vaani (Ashwini) and Abhirami (Tejaswini Prakash). Vijaya wants Thirupathi to take charge of their export company. So Thirupathi becomes the new managing director of the company. His cousin Vaani and his employee Mohana (Mohana) are in love with him. While in Coimbatore, Thirupathi and Pazhani (look-alikes with the same names) are petty thieves. The pair stumbles upon a bag containing a few lakhs of rupees and escapes to Palakkad. The complications that arise due to the mistaken identities, and the havoc it creates in the life of the foursome, forms the rest of the story.

Cast

Ashok Kashyap as Thirupathi and Thirupathi
Ashwini as Vaani
Mohana as Mohana
Tejaswini Prakash as Abhirami
Crane Manohar as Pazhani and Pazhani
Vinaya Prasad as Vijaya
Sudheesh as Hariharan
Madhan Bob as Krishnamoorthy
Sathyapriya as Savithri
Adade Manohar as Inspector Chandrakanth
Rajkrishna as Shop owner

Production
Ashok Kashyap, a cinematographer and a producer in Kannada cinema, planned to remake the Kannada film Ulta Palta (1997) in Tamil language. Apart from directing and producing the film, Ashok Kashyap also played the lead role. Comedian Crane Manohar, who after doing small comedy roles, got his first major lead role. Ashwini, Vinaya Prasad and Malayalam film actor Sudheesh were also added to the cast.

Soundtrack

The film score and the soundtrack were composed by Dhina. The soundtrack, released in 2005, features 5 tracks.

Reception
Malini Mannath said, "one would never have thought that a plot with such potential for humour would turn out to be such a tragic experience for the viewers. And the best part of the film? The acknowledgement that it is an adaptation of Shakespeare's Comedy of Errors. Though one wouldn't like to know what the bard would have thought of this one".

References

External links

2005 films
2000s Tamil-language films
Indian comedy films
Films shot in Coimbatore
Modern adaptations of works by William Shakespeare
Films based on The Comedy of Errors
Twins in Indian films
Tamil remakes of Kannada films
2005 comedy films